Provocator is a genus of sea snails, marine gastropod mollusks in the family Volutidae.

Species
Species within the genus Provocator include:
 Provocator alabastrina (Watson, 1882)
 Provocator mirabilis (Finlay, 1926)
 Provocator corderoi Carcelles, 1947
 Provocator palliata (Kaiser, 1977)
 Provocator pulcher Watson, 1882

References

Volutidae